This list of songs about Berlin is an addition to the main article Music in Berlin and contains any songs about or involving the city of Berlin, the capital of Germany.
Sorting is after the year of publication (in brackets).

Up to 1945 
 Drei Andere – Eine kleine Ewigkeit • Blau ist der Himmel über der Spree
 folk song – Bolle reiste jüngst zu Pfingsten
 Paul Lincke – Berliner Luft (1904) • Nach der Liebesinsel laß uns gehn • Das ist der Zauber von Berlin
 Otto Reutter – Berlin is ja so groß (about 1913)
 Walter Kollo – Untern Linden, untern Linden • Das war in Schöneberg im Monat Mai • Die kleine Bank am Großen Stern • So lang noch untern Linden
 Titto Manowitz – Im Grunewald ist Holzauktion
 Oskar Klein – In Rixdorf ist Musike (Musik: Eugen Phillipi)
 Berliner Volksmund – Denkste denn, du Berliner Pflanze (Musik: Marsch aus Petersburg about 1820)
 Claire Waldoff – An de Panke – an de Wuhle – an de Spree • Die Großstadtpflanze • Emilie vom Kurfürstendamm • Es gibt nur ein Berlin • Im Nußbaum links vom Molkenmarkt • In Tegel gibts lockere Vögel • Wat braucht der Berliner um glücklich zu sein • Werderlied
 Marlene Dietrich – Berlin Berlin • Das ist Berlin • Das war in Schöneberg • Du hast ja keine Ahnung wie schön du bist Berlin • Ich hab noch einen Koffer in Berlin • Durch Berlin fließt immer noch die Spree • Nach meine Beene ist ganz Berlin verrückt • Unter'n Linden • Sonntags angeln gehn
 Frank Sinatra – There'll Be a Hot Time in the Town of Berlin
 Bing Crosby & The Andrews Sisters – Hot Time in the Town of Berlin
 Ozzie Waters – A Rodeo Down in Tokyo and a Round Up in Old Berlin
 Jack Little – I've Always Wanted to Dance in Berlin
 Kurt Weill — Berlin im Licht

From 1945 to 1989 
 Conny Froboess – Pack die Badehose ein (1951)
 The Hush – Dancing in East Berlin
 Gina Presgott – Pack die Badehose ein (1952, DDR- satiric version)
 Gerhard Wendland – Heimweh nach dir (1952)
 Fred Oldörp (Die 3 Travellers) – Kleiner Bär von Berlin (1952)
 Schöneberger Sängerknaben – Berliner Jungens, die sind richtig • Grüße aus Berlin • Jetzt ist der Himmel blau in Berlin • Parole: Treffpunkt Zoo • Uns're Stadt hört doch nicht am Brandenburger Tor auf
 Hildegard Knef – Berlin, dein Gesicht hat Sommersprossen • Das ist Berlin • Heimweh nach dem Kurfürstendamm • Ich hab noch einen Koffer in Berlin
 Ernst Busch – Roter Wedding
 Édith Piaf – L'homme de Berlin (1963)
 Günter Pfitzmann – An die Berlinerin (1964)
 Gerd Natschinski – Zeig mir mal Berlin, aus dem „Musikalischen Lustspiel" Servus Peter (1966)
 Spencer Davis Group – Det war in Schöneberg (1967)
 Bob Telden – Berlin erwacht (1969)
 Medium-Terzett – Spree-Walzer
 Thomas Natschinski und Gruppe – Mokka-Milch-Eisbar
 Rio Reiser – Sonnenallee
 Ton Steine Scherben – Rauch-Haus-Song (1972), Mensch Meier
 Lou Reed – Berlin (1973)
 Wizz Jones – When I leave Berlin (1973)
 PVC – Berlin by Night (1977)
 Iggy Pop – Lust For Life (1977)
 Iggy Pop – The Passenger (1977)
 Karussell – Kleine Freundin aus Schönefeld (1977)
 Lone Star – Bells of Berlin (1977)
 Sex Pistols - Holidays in the Sun (1977)
 David Bowie : Neuköln (1977)
 Barclay James Harvest – Berlin (1978)
 Japan – Suburban Berlin (1978)
 Gebrüder Blattschuss – Kreuzberger Nächte (1978)
 Bel Ami – Berlin bei Nacht (1979)
 Widows – Wall of Berlin (1979)
 DAF (Deutsch Amerikanische Freundschaft) – Kebabträume (1979)
 Ideal – Berlin (1980)
 Geile Tiere – Berlin Nite (1980)
 Billy Branch and Lurrie Bell – Berlin Wall (1980)
 The Stranglers – Bear cage (1980)
 Einstürzende Neubauten – Steh auf Berlin (1981)
 Fischer-Z – Berlin (1981) • Back to Berlin (2004)
 KFC (Kriminalitätsförderungsclub) – Stille Tage in Ost-Berlin (1981)
 Mobiles – Drowning in Berlin (1982)
 Herman Brood – Berlin schmerzt (1982)
 Leinemann – Treffpunkt Berlin (1982)
 Milva – Alexanderplatz (1982)
 Rational Youth – Dancing on the Berlin Wall (1982) 
 UKW – Sommersprossen (1982)
 Udo Lindenberg – Sonderzug nach Pankow (1983) • Gummi in Berlin • Ich hab noch einen Koffer in Berlin • In den Ruinen von Berlin • Mädchen aus Ostberlin • Seid willkommen in Berlin • Russen
 Wolf Biermann – Berlin • Frühling auf dem Mont Klamott
 Helga Hahnemann – Berlin • Berlin, meine Liebe • Hundert mal Berlin • Hätt ick man lieber (Ode einer Berlinerin)
 Pooh – Lettera da Berlino Est (1983)
 Savage – Berlin (1983)
 Alphaville – Summer in Berlin (1984)
 Marius Müller-Westernhagen – Berlin
 Nina Hagen – Berlin • Berlin is dufte • Aufm Bahnhof Zoo
 Reinhard Mey – Berlin tut weh • Mein Berlin • Aber zuhaus' kann ich nur in Berlin sein • Zwischen Kiez und Kudamm • Ich trag' den Staub von deinen Straßen
 Klaus Hoffmann – Berlin (1978) • Was fang ich an in dieser Stadt (1978) • Tegel (1985) • Stein auf Stein (1991) • Stadt ohne Namen (1998) • Derselbe Mond über Berlin • Kreuzberger Walzer (1978) • Krumme Lanke • Morjen Berlin • Ratten der Großstadt • Salambo
 Lilli Berlin – Ost-Berlin Wahnsinn (1982)
 Klein Orkest – Over de Muur (Über die Mauer) (1984)
 Bajaga i instruktori – Berlin (1984)
 Camel – West Berlin (1984)
 Paganini – Berlin by Night (1985)
 Rainhard Fendrich – Frühling in Berlin (1985)
 Linie 1 – all songs (this musical talks about a subway-line in Berlin) e.g. Wilmersdorfer Witwen • Fahr mal wieder U-Bahn (1986)
 City – Wand an Wand (1987) • Der King vom Prenzlauer Berg • Z.B. Susann (Berlin)
 John F. und die Gropiuslerchen – Berlin, Berlin (...dein Herz kennt keine Mauern) (1987)
 Jennifer Warnes – First We Take Manhattan (1987)
 Wild Dogs – Streets of Berlin (1987)
 Marillion – Berlin (1988)
 Shy – Break Down the Walls (1987)
 Leonard Cohen – First We Take Manhattan (1988)
 Kult – Arahja (1988)
 Franco Battiato – Alexander Platz (1989)
 Silly – Mont Klamott • Verlorene Kinder (1989) • Berliner Frühling • Halloween in Ostberlin • Heiße Würstchen
 Oktoberklub – Spreeathen (1989)
 Peter Schilling – City Of Night (1989)
 John F. und die Gropiuslerchen – Berlin, Berlin (Mauerfall-Version) (1989)
 Heidi Bruhl – Berlin (1969)
Kombi – Pamiętaj mnie (Remember me) (1989)

Since 1989 
 Die Skeptiker – Berlin • Dada in Berlin
 Quetschenpaua – Q-Damm's Börnin'''
 They Might Be Giants – Road Movie to Berlin (1990)
 Ketil Stokkan – Brandenburger Tor (1990)
 Big Cyc – Berlin Zachodni (West Berlin), (1990)
 U2 – Zoo Station (1991)
 Harald Juhnke – Berlin, Berlin (1992)
 Puhdys – Wie ein Engel (S-Bahn-Surver) (1992)
 Kurt Schulzke – Der Bär kommt aus Berlin (1992)
 Mão Morta – Berlim (Morreu a Nove) (1992)
 U2 – Stay, faraway so close! (1993)
 Vicki Vomit – Sommer in Berlin (1994)
 Second Decay – I Hate Berlin (1994)
 Pink Floyd –  A Great Day for Freedom (1994)
 Guildo Horn – Berlin Reinhard Mey – Mein Berlin (1990)
 The Ramones – Born to Die in Berlin (1995)
 Nepper Schlepper Schlechte Rapper – Sommer in Berlin  (Sony/1996)
 Robbie Williams – Berliner Star Eberhart Schoener, Die Prinzen und Solisten des Tölzer Knabenchores – Potsdamer Platz (Herz von Berlin) (1998)
 Funny van Dannen – Berlin International (1999) • Urbanhafen (1996)
 Element of Crime – Jung und Schön • Alle vier Minuten Udo Lindenberg – Der frische Wind von Berlin Die Sterne – Big in Berlin (1999)
 "Helmholtz-Straßen Blues" – Juan María Solare (1999)
 Surrogat – Berlin liebt Dich (2000)
 Keimzeit – Berlin (2000)
 Harleckinz – Berlin Love (2000)
 Ute Lemper – Streets of Berlin (2000)
 Einstürzende Neubauten – Die Befindlichkeit des Landes (2000)
 Paula – Die Stadt Scarface – Willkommen in Berlin Reinhard Mey – Serefina (2000)
 Midnight Choir – Snow in Berlin (2000)
 Briskeby – Berlin (2000)
 Olaf Schubert – Berlin (bzw. Berlin, wo gehts du hin? 2000)
 Britta – Die traurigsten Menschen (von ganz Berlin) (2001)
 Die Prinzen – Berlin (2001)
 Seeed – Dickes B (2001) • Music Monks (2003) • Schwinger (2005)
 Die Ärzte – Westberlin (2001)
 Ellen Allien – Stadtkind (2001)
 Dritte Wahl – Fasching in Berlin (2002)
 Basta – Berlin (2002)
 Kleingeldprinzessin und die Stadtpiraten – Öffentlicher Nahverkehr (2002)
 Lexy & K-Paul – Der Fernsehturm (2002)
 New York – Willkommen in Berlin (2002)
 Rosenstolz – Tag in Berlin (November) (2002)
 Rocko Schamoni – Berlin Woman (2002)
 City – Berlin 2 (2002)
 Bushido – Berlin (2003)
 Angelika Express – Geh doch nach Berlin (2003)
 Ben – Wir steh'n auf (2003)
 Ian Anderson – Pigeons Flying Over Berlin Zoo (2003)
 Kaiserbase – Berlin, du bist so wunderbar (2003)
 Martin Kesici – Angel of Berlin (2003)
 P. R. Kantate – Görli Görli (2003)
 Culcha Candela – In da city (2004)
 Donato Plögert – Berlin is pleite (2004)
 Jeans Team – Berlin am Meer (2004)
 Rainald Grebe – Miriam (du Blume aus Marzahn) (2004)
 Willy Astor – Berlien, wa! (2004)
 Sido – Berlin Berlin feat. Harris • Westberlin • Mein Block (2004)
 Patrouille – Ruhleben (2004)
 Toni Kater – Berlin (2004)
 BAP – Unger Linde enn Berlin (2004)
 Virginia Jetzt! – Der Himmel über Berlin (2004)
 Wise Guys – Hallo Berlin (2004)
 Taktloss – Westberlin Jungle (2004)
 Rainhard Fendrich – Berlin (2004)
 City – Meine Gegend (2004)
 Boudewijn de Groot – "Unter den Linden" • "Berlijn" (2004)
 Fler – Willkommen in Berlin feat. Sido, B-Tight, Frauenarzt, Megaloh, MC Bogy, Tony D & Shizoe (2005)
 The 69 Eyes – Feel Berlin (2005)
 Bullit – Grimecity • Mittegirl (2005)
 Carpark North – Berlin (2005)
 Sentino – Berlin (2005)
 Der Automat – Trabrennbahn (2005)
 Mach One, Tarek (von K.I.Z), Muerte/Massimo – Willkommen in 361 (2005)
 Rainald Grebe – Brandenburg (song is called Brandenburg but contrasts the differences between the desolate state and the busy city of Berlin, 2005)
 Wohlstandskinder – Deine Nacht über Berlin (2005)
 Nordstrøm – Berlin (2006)
 MC Bogy – Willkommen in Abschaumcity (2006)
 Sera Finale – Berlin (2006)
 Prinz Pi – Würfel • Willkommen in der Hauptstadt •  Das ist Berlin (feat. 82EE) (2005) • Berlin – Grosse Liebe • Meene Stadt (feat. Frank Zander) (2006) • Wir ficken die Welt (2009) • Zu Hause (2011)
 Max Herre – King vom Prenzlauer Berg Roger Cicero – So geil Berlin Rasta Knast – Ost-Berlin Fler – Ich scheine (2006)
 Kleingeldprinzessin und die Stadtpiraten – Der Kanal (2006)
 MIA. – Je dis aime/Ich sag Liebe  (2006)
 Botanica – "Berlin HiFi" (2006)
 Sender Freie Rakete – Istanbulberlin (2006)
 TempEau – Du bist verrückt mein Kind (Bang City) (2006)
 Nils Heinrich (Brauseboys) – Angeln Berlin (2006)
 Marsimoto – "Green Berlin" (2006)
 Lisi (Rapperin) – "Berlin" (2006)
 Kim Frank – Berlin (2007)
 Fler – Berlin Flair • Berlin Zoo (feat. Massiv) (2007)
 Patroulle – Und am Prenzlauer Berg herrscht die Angst vorm Versagen (2007)
 Bloc Party – Kreuzberg (2007)
 Rufus Wainwright – Tiergarten (2007)
 Kante – Wer hierher kommt, will vor die Tür •  Die große alte neue Stadt (2007)
 Tele – Bye Bye Berlin (2007)
 Infernal – From Paris to Berlin B-Tight – "Zack Zack" (2007)
 P.R. Kantate – In Balin (2007)
 Jahcoozi – BLN (2007)
 Icke & Er – Keen Hawaii (2007)
 Panda – Hierbleiben (2007)
 Black Rebel Motorcycle Club – Berlin (2007)
 Beirut – Prenzlauer berg (2007)
 Kat Frankie – Berlin Cops (2007)
 Kent – Berlin (2007)
 Genepool – Berlin By Night (2007)
 Trikot – Wasser aus der Spree (2008)
 Peter Fox – Fieber, Schwarz zu blau (2008)
 Illdisposed – Verloren in Berlin (2008)
 Robots in Disguise – I Live in Berlin (2008)
 Fler – Berlin (2008)
 Sugarplum Fairy – In Berlin (2008)
 Mario Barth – Mensch Berlin (2008) (zusammen mit Paul Kuhn)
 In Extremo – Berlin (2008)
 The Mountain Goats – Marduk T-shirt Men's Room Incident (2008)
 <<link:0>> – "The Hollows" (2008)
 Sven van Thom – Jaqueline (Ich hab Berlin gekauft) (2008)
 Hecklah und Coch – Berlin (2008)
 Christophe Willem – Berlin (2009)
 Tony D – Meine Gang (2009)
 Elektrohoden – Hey hey schöner Szenetyp (2009)
 Moderat – Berlin (2009)
 Ludovico Einaudi – Berlin Song (2009)
 Culcha Candela – Berlin city girl (2011)
 Modeselektor – Berlin (2011)
 Mark Tarmonea – So Berlin – Freddy Verano Remix (2014)
 Kraftklub – Ich Will Nicht Nach Berlin (2011)
 R.E.M. – Überlin (2011)
Sido, Mario Barth – Ick liebe Dir (2011)
 Shezzer 1 Eye – Walking In Berlin (2012)
 Albin – Berlin (2012)
 New Politics – Berlin (2013)
 In Isolation – Berlin (2013)
 David Bowie – Where Are We Now? (2013)
 Eastintya – Be Berlin (2013)
 LCD Soundsystem – North American Scum Metronomy – The Bay Hello Saferide – Berlin (2014)
 Under Pub – Berlin (2014)
 Die Toten Hosen – Was Macht Berlin? AK Ausserkontrolle – Echte Berliner (2015)
 Romano – Köpenick (2015)
 Ufo361 – Ich bin ein Berliner (2015)
 Parquet Courts – Berlin got blurry (2016)
 Endlich August – Das ist Berlin (2016)
 Fler – Unterwegs feat. Sentino (2016)
 Max Koffler – Choose your fate (2017)
 Bushido – Echte Berliner feat. AK Ausserkontrolle (2017) Vidi Aquam – Breathless (2018)
 Shakira – Nada (2018)
 Bear's Den – Berlin (2016)
NO MORE – Berlin Soul (2021)
Eli SV - Berlin'' (2022)

References

External links 
BERLIN songs playlist
11 Famous Songs Dedicated Entirely to Berlin
12 Songs You Need To Listen To When In Berlin
10 songs dedicated to Berlin | DW | 30 September 2015
List of Irving Berlin Songs and Music 1909–1922. Music Of Yesterday. Retrieved 2019-04-11.
Berlin Songs – a list of Songs about Berlin – Nuberlin.com
Berlin Song List

Songs
Songs about Berlin
Lists of songs about a city
Dynamic lists of songs